HMS Fame was a two funnel, 30 knot destroyer of the Royal Navy, ordered under the 1894–1895 Naval Estimates.  She was launched in 1896, served in Chinese waters for the whole of her life and was sold at Hong Kong in 1921.

Design and construction
HMS Fame was one of three "thirty-knotter" torpedo boat destroyers ordered for the Royal Navy from John I Thornycroft on 10 May 1895 under the 1894–1895 shipbuilding programme. As with other early Royal Navy destroyers, the detailed design was left to the builder, with the Admiralty laying down only broad requirements. These requirements included reaching a speed of  during sea trials and an armament of a single QF 12 pounder 12 cwt ( calibre) gun, backed up by five 6-pounder guns, and two 18-inch (450 mm) torpedo tubes. An arched turtleback forecastle was to be fitted.

Displacement was  light and  full load, while crew was 63 officers and men.

Fame was laid down as yard number 306 on 4 July 1895 at Thornycroft's shipyard at Chiswick on the River Thames and was launched on 15 April 1896. She had her armament fitted at Portsmouth, was completed and was accepted by the Royal Navy in June 1897.

Pre-war
On 26 June 1897 she was present at the Royal Naval Review at Spithead in celebration of Queen Victoria's Diamond Jubilee. In the second half of 1897 she was deployed to the China Station and remained there for the rest of her service life.

On 17 June 1900, during the Boxer Rebellion in China, she was involved in operations against the Taku forts and Chinese destroyers. The battle of the Taku Forts resulted in the capture of four Chinese destroyers including Hai Lung (later renamed HMS Taku). She was awarded the battle honour "China 1900" for her participation in operations during the Chinese Boxer Rebellion.

Lieutenant Cyril Asser was appointed in command on 1 July 1902. Her boilers were re-tubed in 1902, and she was docked in May 1904.

On 30 August 1912 the Admiralty directed all destroyer classes were to be designated by letters starting with the letter 'A'.  As a two funneled destroyer with a contract speed of 30 knots, Fame was assigned to the D class after 30 September 1913. and had the letter 'D' painted on the hull below the bridge area and on either the fore or aft funnel.

World War I
In 1914 she was assigned to the Eastern Fleet in the China Squadron tendered to the battleship .  She remained on China Station for the duration of the First World War.

Fate
In 1919 she was paid off and laid-up in reserve awaiting disposal.  She was sold in Hong Kong on 31 August 1921 for breaking.

References

Citations

Bibliography

External links
  OldWeather.org transcription of ship's logbooks August 1919 to June 1920

 

Ships built in Chiswick
1896 ships
D-class destroyers (1913)
World War I destroyers of the United Kingdom
Ships built by John I. Thornycroft & Company